Bal Ganghadhar Shastri Jambhekar (20 December 1810 – 17 May 1846) is also known as Father of Marathi journalism for his efforts in starting journalism in Marathi language with the first newspaper in the language named 'Darpan' in the early days of British Rule in India.

Birth 
He was born in a karhade Brahmin family on 1812 in the village of Pombhurle in Devgad taluka (Sindhudurga) in Konkan region of Maharashtra state. Talented and intelligent since childhood, Jambhekar became a great scholar and researcher in many subjects on adulthood. He was active only for a very short period, but his exceptional work left a permanent mark on India. And he died in Baneshwar.

Establishment of First Newspaper in Marathi Language – Darpan 
Balshastri Jambhekar had grasped correctly the importance and power of the print media in the coming times during British Rule in India. He was sure that if the British were to be overthrown and freedom was to be attained, then it was essential to awaken the masses and the print media was the most useful tool to that end.

The newspaper Darpan was born out of this patriotism and social awareness. He founded Darpan as the first Marathi newspaper. He was editor of this newspaper during the British rule in India. This turned out to be the beginning of Marathi journalism. Balshastri Jambhekar was only 20 years old then.

His associates in this phase included people like Govind Kunte and Bhau Mahajan.

The first issue of Darpan was published on 6 January 1832. The newspaper was printed both in English and Marathi languages in two separate columns. Marathi was meant for the general public and English was meant for the ruling British. It was priced at 1 rupee. Newspaper was a new idea in India at that time hence there were very few subscribers in the beginning but slowly people appreciated it and agreed with the thoughts expressed in it. The readership grew.

It was published for eight and half years. The last issue was published in July 1840.

Social Impact of Darpan 
He specifically dealt with the issues of widow remarriage in his newspaper. He tried to develop a scientific set of mind in the masses of uneducated Indian, Maharashtra.

This resulted in a large-scale debate in the society and finally in a movement for the support of widow remarriage.

He passionately desired that the knowledge should percolate in the society and Darpan was one of the means to this end. He was aware that the country could only progress with the use of scientific knowledge and a rational outlook towards social problems. He wanted to build a society having a scientific outlook. He was one of those social activists who made continuous effort in generating useful and healthy consciousness amongst the common masses and attempted to educate the uneducated. His never-dying talent and endeavour left a stamp over not only the Maharashtrian public, but across India, as a distinguished social reformer and journalist.

Other contributions 
Balshastri Jambhekar understood the importance of public libraries. He founded 'The Bombay Native General Library'. He also started 'Native Improvement Society', of which 'Student's Literary and Scientific Society' was an offshoot. Intellectual giants like Dadabhai Navroji and Bhau Daji Lad drew inspiration through these institutions.
Dadabhai Naoroji, Atmaram Pandurang and many other prominent scholars, future activists were Bal Shastri's pupils at the Elphinstone College.
In 1840 he published first Marathi monthly, Digdarshan (meaning direction in English). He edited this magazine for 5 years. Digdarshan published articles on various subjects including physics, chemistry, geography, history etc.

He had mastery in many languages including Marathi, Sanskrit, English and Hindi. Apart from that he also had a good grasp of Greek, Latin, French, Gujarati and Bengali.

He was the first Indian to have published research papers in the quarterly journal of the Asiatic Society. He was the first person to print Dnyaneshwari in 1845. It was known as the first ever-printed version.

He was also well known as the first professor of Hindi in the Elphinston College, Mumbai. He also worked as Director of the Colaba Observatory. He wrote books like Neetikatha (stories on morality), Encyclopedic History of England, English grammar, History of India and Mathematics based on Zero.

He was active during the years 1830 to 1846 and worked for the betterment of Maharashtra and India. He had a very short life span of just 34 years. But in those years as well he tried to educate people and develop a scientific mindset. He a stamp of his personality as a social reformer and a journalist during the period 1832 to 1846.

Recognition 
For these contributions in the form of first Marathi newspaper and first Marathi monthly, he is acknowledged as The Father of Marathi Journalism. The day of publication of the first issue of Darpan is 6 January and it is celebrated as the Journalist Day in Maharashtra in his memory.

While he died in 1846 further recognition was forthcoming in 1901 when Justice Narayan Ganesh Chandavarkar while delivering eulogy for the just died Justice M G Ranade ( in whose place he had been appointed as justice at Bombay High Court) noted that in terms of intellectual stature Balshastri Jambhekar was perhaps the only one who could have matched up to the intellectual level of Justice Ranade who he said was one of the foremost of Indian university graduates.

References

A profile of Mr Balshastri Jambhekar on MNS site

1812 births
1846 deaths
Marathi people
Journalists from Maharashtra
People from Sindhudurg district
Indian newspaper founders
19th-century Indian journalists
Indian male journalists